Iron Duff (also Aaron Duff, or Ironduff) is an unincorporated community in Haywood County, North Carolina, United States.

Geography
Iron Duff is located at latitude 35.579 and longitude -82.970 The elevation is 2,592 feet.

History
Prior to European colonization, the area that is now Iron Duff was inhabited by the Cherokee people and other Indigenous peoples for thousands of years. The Cherokee in Western North Carolina are known as the Eastern Band of Cherokee Indians, a federally recognized tribe.

References

Unincorporated communities in Haywood County, North Carolina
Unincorporated communities in North Carolina